The Silent Circus is the second studio album by American progressive metal band Between the Buried and Me. Released October 21, 2003, through Victory Records. It was their first album to be released through Victory Records after their departure from Lifeforce Records. It was re-released in 2006 with a bonus DVD included. The album includes 10 tracks with a hidden song titled "The Man Land" hidden at the end of "The Need for Repetition". It is notable for being the band's only album not to be produced by Jamie King. The album was remixed and remastered in 2020.

This is the band's last release with guitarist Nick Fletcher and bassist Jason King and only album with drummer Mark Castillo.

A music video was released for the song "Mordecai"; the video starts with the first nineteen seconds of "Reaction" before transitioning into "Mordecai".

The two part song "Lost Perfection" are the first songs in the Parallax story, which would further develop in "Prequel of the Sequel" from their album Colors and "Swim to the Moon" from their album The Great Misdirect. The Parallax story later became its own EP and album respectively, The Parallax: Hypersleep Dialogues and The Parallax II: Future Sequence.

Reception 
The album received generally positive reviews from professional critics. Adrien Begrand of PopMatters opined in a positive review for the album, "The Raleigh, North Carolina, band had sliced and diced its way through multiple extreme metal subgenres, bridging the "math metal" complexity of the Dillinger Escape Plan, the godly hardcore of Converge, the furious technical death metal of Nile, and the more melodic strains of mid-'90s Swedish death metal with astonishing dexterity." Kurt Morris of Allmusic commented, "One minute the band may be playing thrash metal and the next they're flowing into death growls and thick guitar riffs. They certainly show a mastery of the hardcore and metal styles that many bands their age can take a lot longer to understand. The metal take on things can seemingly change in a flash as lead singer Tommy Rogers fleshes out his vocals and utilizes the keyboards to create something that sounds more like it should be on a Smashing Pumpkins album".

In 2021, The Silent Circus was included on BrooklynVegan's list of "15 Seminal Albums From Metalcore's Second Wave (2000-2010)."

Track listing

Personnel 
Between the Buried and Me
 Tommy Giles Rogers – lead vocals, keyboards
 Paul Waggoner – lead guitar, rhythm guitar, backing vocals, vocals on "Shevanel Take 2"
 Nick Fletcher – rhythm guitar
 Jason King – bass guitar
 Mark Castillo – drums

Production
 Matthew Ellard – production, mixing, recording
 Between the Buried and Me – production
 Carl Platter – drum technician

References 

Between the Buried and Me albums
2003 albums
Victory Records albums
Technical death metal albums